Ab Garm-e Khurgu (also Romanized as Āb Garm-e Khūrgū; also known as Āb Garm) is a village in Isin Rural District, in the Central District of Bandar Abbas County, Hormozgan Province, Iran. At the 2006 census, its population was 11, in 6 families.

References 

Populated places in Bandar Abbas County